William Robin Taylor  (11 October 1938 – 3 October 2015) was a writer from New Zealand.

Biography
Taylor was born in Lower Hutt. Before he began writing in the 1980s, Taylor worked as a primary school principal and served as mayor of Ohakune from 1981 to 1988, before moving to Raurimu. He won the Choysa Bursary in 1986, and turned his attention to writing full-time that year. Taylor's last book was published in 2010, the memoir Telling Tales: A Life in Writing. 

Taylor died in 2015 at Taumarunui. His funeral was held on 8 October 2015, three days before he was to turn 77.

Honours and awards
Over the course of his career, Taylor won the Esther Glen Award (1991), an AIM Children's Book Award (1995), a Margaret Mahy Medal (1999), and was nominated for a Lambda Literary Award (2000).

In the 2004 Queen's Birthday Honours, Taylor was appointed an Officer of the New Zealand Order of Merit, for services to children's literature and the community.

Bibliography

Adult Fiction 
Episode (1970)
The Mask of the Clown (1970)
The Plekhov Place (1971)
Pieces in a Jigsaw (1972)
The Persimmon Tree (1972)
The Chrysalis (1974)

Non Fiction 
Burnt Carrots Dont Have Legs (1976),
Telling Tales a Life in Writing (2010)

Young Adult Fiction 
Pack Up, Pick Up And Off (1981), 
Shooting Though (1986),
My Summer Of The Lions (1986),
Possum Perkins (1987) printed in the US as Paradise Lane (1987), 
The Worst Soccer Team Ever (1987), 
Break A Leg (1987),
Making Big Bucks (1987),
I Hate My Brother Maxwell Potter (1989),
Kidnap of Jessie Parker (1989), 
Agnes The Sheep (1990),
The Porter Brothers (1990),
Knitwits (1992),
Supermum And Spike The Dog (1992),
Fast Times At Greenhill High (1992),
Beth And Bruno (1992),
S.W.A.T. The Southside War Against Terrorists (1993),
The Blue Lawn (1994),
Numbskulls (1995),
The Fatz Katz (1995),
Annie and Co. And Marilyn Munroe (1995),
The Fatz Twins And The Haunted House (1996),
Nicks Story (1996),
Circles (1996),
Hark The Herald Angel (1997),
The Fatz Twins And The Cuckoo In The Nest (1997),
At Then Big Red Rooster (1998),
Harry Houdini-Wonderdog! (1999),
Jerome (1999),
Hotmail (2000), 
Crash!  The Story Of Poddy (2000),
Scarface and the Angel (2000),
Spider; A Novel (2001),
Pebble in a Pool (2003),
Land of Milk and Honey (2005),
Gladys the Goat (2005)
Albert the Cat (2005)

References

1938 births
2015 deaths
20th-century New Zealand writers
20th-century New Zealand male writers
21st-century New Zealand writers
New Zealand children's writers
Mayors of places in Manawatū-Whanganui
People from Lower Hutt
Officers of the New Zealand Order of Merit
People from Ohakune
International Writing Program alumni